The Truro Bearcats are a Junior "A" ice hockey team based out of Truro, Nova Scotia. The Bearcats are one of six Nova Scotia teams in the Maritime Junior Hockey League.

History

Metro Valley League years
Originally, Truro was a member of the Metro Valley Junior Hockey League. The Bearcats won five championships in the MVJHL. Three back to back from 1969-70 to 1971-72. Truro won two more championships in 1973-74 and 1975-76.
In 1977 the MVJHL became a Junior "A" league and the Bearcats folded mid season in 1983.

Return of junior hockey
The new franchise of 1997 marked the return of junior hockey to Truro, and the Bearcats return to the MJAHL.
The Truro Bearcats were formed in 1997 as a member of the Maritime Jr A Hockey League. The Bearcats have stayed competitive over their franchise history, they have never had a losing record, and have never missed the playoffs.

During the 2001 MJAHL Draft, the Bearcats picked 13-year-old minor hockey phenom Sidney Crosby  During the 2001-02 season, as a call-up, Crosby played a two-game call-up stint with the Bearcats.  Despite minimal playing time, Crosby still managed an assist.

In 2002, the Truro Bearcats played in their first Fred Page Cup as the host squad, They made four other appearances three as MJAHL champions, one in 2005, at a tournament hosted in Yarmouth Nova Scotia, and one in 2007 Saint-Jérôme Quebec. In 2013 the Bearcats hosted the tournament for a second time and a first time at their new home Rath Eastlink Community Centre winning the Final 3-2 in double Overtime against the Summerside Western Capitals. In 2014 The Bearcats made a second consecutive appearance in the Fred Page Cup tournament hosted by Saint-Jérôme

Truro captured their third Division Championship and third Provincial Championship in five seasons in 2008/09. The Bearcats would be defeated by the Summerside Western Capitals in the league final four games to one.

The 2011-12 season was the Bearcats final full season at the Colchester Legion Stadium.

A new home
The town of Truro and County of Colchester are constructing the new Central Nova Scotia Civic Centre, a rink that is supposed to seat 2600+ spectators. The rink will be the new home of the Bearcats upon completion. The Bearcats will kick off their inaugural season in the new building by hosting the Fred Page Cup for the second time in franchise history (The first being in 2002) .

On February 13, 2013 officials from the Rath Eastlink Community Centre confirmed the first home game for the Bearcats would be held on March 2, 2013, and would coincide with the opening of the new facility. The Bearcats are not charging any admission fee to their inaugural game in the community centre, but will be accepting donations to local a charity. Management is hoping for a large crowd in anticipation of the arena finally opening after many delays.

Logo and uniforms

The Truro Bearcats primary logo is large red or black T while their secondary logo features a bearcat jumping. In print, or other media the Bearcats logo consists of a large red T with a small jumping bearcat to the lower right.

2015–present

These home and away jerseys were first introduced for use in the 2015-16 season. They are a similar but updated version of the previous design. They keep the history of the team while modernizing the look of the jersey.

2009–2015

This jersey unveiled in the 2009-10 season features a large T on the front and the design of the Boston Bruins from 1995-2007. The jersey design is similar to the uniform the Bearcats would have worn in the 1920s and was implemented to bring back some tradition to the community.

1997-2009

The logo is similar to that of the Florida Panthers of the NHL.  The Bearcats' old jersey is that of the Buffalo Sabres from 1996/97 - 2005/06.

Seasons and records

Season-by-season results

Note: GP = Games played, W = Wins, L = Losses, T = Ties, OTL = Overtime Losses, Pts = Points, GF = Goals for, GA = Goals against, PIM = Penalties in minutes

Fred Page Cup
Eastern Canada Championships
MHL - QAAAJHL - CCHL - Host
Round robin play with 2nd vs 3rd in semi-final to advance against 1st in the finals.

Royal Bank Cup
CANADIAN NATIONAL CHAMPIONSHIPS
Dudley Hewitt Champions - Central, Fred Page Champions - Eastern, Western Canada Cup Champions - Western, Trenton Golden HawksWestern Canada Cup - Runners Up and Host
Round robin play with top 4 in semi-final and winners to finals.

Franchise records

These are franchise records held by previous team rosters. Figures are updated after each completed MHL regular season.

Franchise individual records

Franchise scoring leaders
These are the top-ten point-scorers in franchise history. Figures are updated after each completed MHL regular season.

''Note: G = Goals; A = Assists; Pts = Points; Season(s) = Seasons played with franchise

Records – skaters
Career
Most seasons: 5, Travis Moore
Most goals: 97, T.J. Smith
Most assists: 139, Jon Reid
Most points: 200, Stephen Horyl
Most penalty minutes: 675, Donald Johnstone

Season
Most goals in a season: 47, Kyle Tibbo (2016–17)
Most assists in a season: 63, Dana Fraser (2009–10)
Most points in a season: 90, Dana Fraser (2009–10)
Most penalty minutes in a season: 348, Vincent Muller (2002–03)

Leaders

Team captains
Robbie Dickson, 1997-1999
Todd Kennedy, 1999-00
Alan Dwyer, 2000–01
Bryant Fraser, 2001–02
Joel Isenor, 2002–03
Jim White, 2003–04
Glenn Frazee, 2004–05
Matt Beaver, 2005-2007
Rodi Short, 2007–08
Sam Hounsell, 2008–09
Ben MacAskill, 2009–10
Evan Watts, 2010–11
Matt English, 2011–12
Travis Moore, 2012–13
Phillip Fife, 2013–14
Brandon Pye (home) and Jake Primeau (road), 2014-2015 
Jimmy Soper, 2015-2016 
Kyle Tibbo, 2016-2017 
Campbell Pickard, 2017-2018 
Dylan Burton, 2018-2019 
Ben Higgins, 2019-2020
Leon Denny, 2020-2021
Holden Kodak, 2021-2022

Head coaches
Steve Crowell, 1997-2001
Dave Barett, 2001
Shawn Evans, 2001–present

Honoured members
David Brine, 2002–03, jersey retired May 3, 2013
Matt Climie, 2002-2004, jersey retired May 3, 2013
Zach Sill, 2005-2007, jersey retired April 17, 2015

League awards

Team awards

Individual awards

Notable alumni
The Truro Bearcats have had many players develop and pass through the organization. Many have gone on to play university hockey and major junior hockey. Truro has also had players move on to play in the National Hockey League or American Hockey League.

Andrew MacDonald
Zach Sill
Matt Climie
Mark Cody
David Brine
Franklin MacDonald
Rodi Short
Sidney Crosby

See also
List of ice hockey teams in Nova Scotia

References

External links
Official Bearcat Web Site
Official MHL Web Site

Ice hockey teams in Nova Scotia
Maritime Junior Hockey League teams
Truro, Nova Scotia
Ice hockey clubs established in 1997
1997 establishments in Nova Scotia